Abyathamangala  is a village in the southern state of Karnataka, India. It is located in the Somvarpet taluk of Kodagu district.

See also
 Kodagu
 Districts of Karnataka
 Mangalore

References

External links
 http://Kodagu.nic.in/

Villages in Kodagu district